Christopher Paul Gimenez (born December 27, 1982) is an American former professional baseball catcher. He played in Major League Baseball (MLB) for the Cleveland Indians, Seattle Mariners, Tampa Bay Rays, Texas Rangers, Chicago Cubs and Minnesota Twins.

Career

Amateur 
In 2001, Gimenez graduated from Gilroy High School in Gilroy, California. He was drafted by the Colorado Rockies in the 34th round (1,024th overall) of the 2001 Major League Baseball draft, but did not sign and instead attended the University of Nevada.

Cleveland Indians 
The Cleveland Indians selected Gimenez in the 19th round (557th overall) of the 2004 Major League Baseball draft. He signed and joined the Indians minor league system, playing with the Mahoning Valley Scrappers, Lake County Captains, Kinston Indians, Akron Aeros, Buffalo Bisons, and Columbus Clippers. He was a non-roster invitee to spring training for the 2008 and 2009 Indians, but started each season in the minors.

Gimenez made his MLB debut on June 3, 2009. On February 24, 2010, Gimenez was outrighted to Triple-A Columbus to make room on the 40-man roster for Russell Branyan. He remained in camp with the Indians for the duration of spring training as a non-roster invitee. On July 10, 2010, Gimenez's contract was purchased by the Indians, and he was added to the active roster, replacing Mike Redmond, who was designated for assignment. Gimenez was outrighted to Triple-A Columbus on October 29, 2010, removing him from the 40-man roster. He filed for free agency on November 6, 2010.

Seattle Mariners 
On December 14, 2010, Gimenez signed a minor league contract with the Seattle Mariners. On December 12, 2011, the Mariners announced that Gimenez had been non-tendered along with pitcher Dan Cortes. Two days later, on December 14, the club announced that they had re-signed Gimenez to a contract. He was designated for assignment on February 6, 2012, and soon after, he declared for free agency.

Tampa Bay Rays 
The Tampa Bay Rays signed him to a minor league contract on February 16. He also received an invitation to spring training. He was with the organization for two seasons.

Texas Rangers and Cleveland Indians 

On December 20, 2013, Gimenez was claimed off waivers by the Oakland Athletics. He was then claimed off waivers by the Texas Rangers on March 28, 2014. He made the Rangers opening day roster on March 31, but was designated for assignment the next day. He elected to become a free agent on April 5. He re-signed a minor league contract on April 9 and was assigned to the Rangers' Triple-A affiliate, the Round Rock Express.

Gimenez's returned to the Rangers when his contract was selected from Round Rock on May 20 when J. P. Arencibia was optioned to Round Rock. He made the first pitching appearance of his Major League career on July 10, 2014, in the ninth inning of a blowout loss for the Rangers against the Los Angeles Angels. He pitched a 1-2-3 inning, including a swinging strikeout of C. J. Cron. Gimenez was designated for assignment on August 7. He was acquired by the Cleveland Indians on August 23, 2014. 

Gimenez signed a minor league deal with the Rangers on November 20, 2014. On July 31, 2015, Gimenez was recalled from Triple-A Round Rock after Tomas Telis was traded to the Miami Marlins. He appeared in the postseason for the first time in the 2015 ALDS.

Gimenez was traded back to the Cleveland Indians on May 4, 2016, in exchange for cash considerations. On November 18, 2016, Gimenez was outrighted off the 40-man roster; he subsequently elected free agency on November 21, 2016.

Minnesota Twins and Chicago Cubs
On January 12, 2017, Gimenez signed a minor league contract with the Minnesota Twins that included an invitation to spring training. Gimenez made the Twins' 25-man roster out of camp.

On April 23, 2017, Gimenez pitched for his fourth time to Andrew Romine of the Detroit Tigers in the top of the 9th inning, resulting in a pop-fly out to retire the inning. He was outrighted to AAA on November 6, 2017.

On January 22, 2018, Gimenez signed a minor league deal with the Chicago Cubs. 
He made his debut with the team on May 28, 2018, with a single in his first at-bat against the Pittsburgh Pirates. On July 4, 2018, the Cubs designated him for assignment.

On August 30, 2018, Gimenez and cash were traded back to the Twins in exchange for Bobby Wilson.

Coaching
After the 2018 season, he retired from playing to take on the role of Game Planning Coach for the Los Angeles Dodgers.

References

External links

 

1982 births
Living people
People from Gilroy, California
Baseball players from California
Major League Baseball catchers
Cleveland Indians players
Seattle Mariners players
Tampa Bay Rays players
Texas Rangers players
Minnesota Twins players
Chicago Cubs players
Nevada Wolf Pack baseball players
Mahoning Valley Scrappers players
Lake County Captains players
Kinston Indians players
Akron Aeros players
Buffalo Bisons (minor league) players
Columbus Clippers players
Tacoma Rainiers players
Durham Bulls players
Round Rock Express players
Surprise Rafters players
Scottsdale Scorpions players
Leones del Caracas players
American expatriate baseball players in Venezuela
Águilas Cibaeñas players
American expatriate baseball players in the Dominican Republic
Frisco RoughRiders players
Iowa Cubs players
Los Angeles Dodgers coaches
Gilroy High School alumni
Anchorage Bucs players